Hyks or Hykš is a surname. Notable people with the surname include: 

Bohuslav Hykš (1889-?), Czech tennis player
Veronika Hyks (born 1951), English voice over actress and narrator